The Kenya national cricket team represents the Republic of Kenya in international cricket. Kenya is an associate member of the International Cricket Council (ICC) which has Twenty20 International (T20I) status after the ICC granted T20I status to all of their members.

They have been an associate member of the ICC since 1981. Since then they have played in five Cricket World Cups from 1996 to 2011 with their best result being a semi-final appearance at the 2003 Cricket World Cup in Southern Africa. They have only qualified for one ICC World Twenty20 tournament with that being in 2007. The Kenyan national team is governed by Cricket Kenya.

Kenya did have One Day International (ODI) status in 1996 in preparation for the 1996 Cricket World Cup and would have it for eighteen years before losing it at the 2014 Cricket World Cup Qualifier where they finished in fifth place. After April 2019, Kenya will play in the 2019–21 ICC Cricket World Cup Challenge League.

History

East Africa team
Full article: East Africa cricket team

Kenya, Tanzania and Uganda combined to form the East Africa cricket team, which became an associate member of the ICC in 1966. They continued playing amongst themselves, and were joined by Zambia in a quadrangular tournament played annually between 1966 and 1980.

India toured East Africa in 1967 and played a three-day match against Kenya on 5 August, which was drawn. Various tours of, and by, East Africa continued, including a tour of England in 1972 and a first-class match between East Africa and the MCC at Nairobi Gymkhana Club in 1974 before East Africa took part in the first Cricket World Cup.

The 1975 Cricket World Cup took place in England, and East Africa were one of two non-test teams invited to the tournament, the other being Sri Lanka. Kenya provided half of the fourteen man squad for the tournament. After warm-up matches against Somerset, Wales, Glamorgan and various club sides, they played in the same first round group as England, India and New Zealand, losing to all three. The World Cup was followed by a first-class match against Sri Lanka at the County Ground, Taunton.

East Africa then took part in the 1979 ICC Trophy, the first ICC Trophy tournament, but did not progress beyond the first round, thus missing out on qualification for the 1979 World Cup.

ICC membership
Long considered the strongest part of the East Africa team, Kenya broke away in 1981 and joined the ICC in their own right as an associate member, shortly after a tour of Zimbabwe in 1980/81. They played two three-day matches against Zimbabwe on that tour, losing both. Kenya played in the ICC Trophy in their own right in 1982, 1986, and 1990, also playing their first first-class match against Pakistan B in September 1986.

1996 World Cup
The 1994 ICC Trophy was hosted in Nairobi and Kenya finished as runners-up to the UAE, thus qualifying for the 1996 World Cup. Kenya then played at home against India A in August 1995, and went on a tour to South Africa in September/October that year, before playing in the World Cup, which was to bring Kenyan cricket to a much wider audience, and catapult them into the spotlight.

Kenya were in the same group as Australia, India, Sri Lanka, the West Indies and Zimbabwe. They played their very first ODI match against India.
 
In what at the time was described as the most startling upsets in the history of the World Cup, Kenya bowled out the West Indies for just 93 and won by 73 runs.

The Kenya national team arrived in India for its maiden world cup having players like Steve Tikolo, Maurice Odumbe and Thomas Odoyo. The team was expected to be crushed by the full member sides in its group and this proved to be correct in most of their matches. But the highlights of their campaign was beating former world cup champions West Indies in a low-scoring affair.

ODI status

Following their World Cup performance, Kenya were given full ODI status by the ICC, and hosted a quadrangular tournament against Pakistan, South Africa and Sri Lanka in September/October 1996. The Netherlands toured in December, playing four one-day matches, with the Kenyans winning them all. They played in the quarter finals of South Africa's Standard Bank Cup in March 1997, losing to Natal by 104 runs at Kingsmead. Following this was the 1997 ICC Trophy, hosted in Malaysia. Kenya reached the final, where they lost to Bangladesh by two wickets. This was followed by a tri-series against Bangladesh and Zimbabwe in October the same year in Nairobi.

England A were the first opposition in 1998, touring Kenya in January. A three-day match was drawn, with England A winning the only one-day match that was not abandoned due to the weather. After this was another spot in the quarter final of the Standard Bank Cup, this time losing to Gauteng by 8 wickets. Kenya visited India in May, playing a triangular ODI series against Bangladesh and India. In the final match of the round-robin stage, Kenya pulled off an upset by beating India by 69 runs.
 
Kenya then competed in the cricket tournament at the 1998 Commonwealth Games. Drawn in the same first round group as New Zealand, Pakistan and Scotland, Kenya only beat the Scots, and finished third in the points table for the group.

Kenya warmed up for the 1999 World Cup with a triangular series in Bangladesh against Bangladesh and Zimbabwe. In the 1999 World Cup itself, they were placed in the same first round group as England, India, South Africa, Sri Lanka and Zimbabwe. Following warm-up games against Somerset, Gloucestershire and Glamorgan, they lost all five of their games in the tournament proper. Following the World Cup, they played a quadrangular tournament at home against India, South Africa and Zimbabwe, again losing all their games.

The 21st century started for Kenya with a visit to Zimbabwe to play in the ICC Emerging Nations Tournament against Denmark, Ireland, the Netherlands, Scotland and Zimbabwe A. Kenya won the tournament and took this form onto a seven match tour of India on which they lost just one game. Pakistan A toured Kenya in July, playing a five match one-day series and a four-day first-class match. The four-day match was drawn, and Kenya won the one-day series 4–1. The 2000 ICC KnockOut Trophy was played in Nairobi in October, with Kenya falling to India at the first hurdle.

The first opponents for Kenya in 2001 were Sri Lanka A, who toured Kenya in January, playing two first-class matches and four one-day matches. Both first-class matches were drawn, and Sri Lanka A won the first two one-day games, with the final two being abandoned. The West Indies came in August for two first-class games and a three match ODI series. The first first-class game was won by the West Indies, with the second being drawn, and the three ODIs all went the way of the visitors. Kenya then played an ODI triangular tournament in South Africa in October, playing against India and the hosts, and picked up a second ODI win over India.

Zimbabwe A toured Kenya towards the end of the year, losing a first-class series 1–0 and a one-day series 3–2.
Kenya toured Sri Lanka in early 2002, playing three first-class and three one-day matches against Sri Lanka A. Sri Lanka A won all three of the first-class games, but Kenya won the one-day series 2–1. The MCC toured Kenya shortly after this, playing one three-day match and six one-day matches against the national side. Five of the one-day matches went the way of the Kenyans before the sixth one-day match and the three-day match were abandoned. Kenya then played in the ICC 6 Nations Challenge tournament in Windhoek, Namibia, playing against Canada, Namibia, the Netherlands, Sri Lanka A and Zimbabwe A. Kenya won the tournament, beating Sri Lanka A by 3 wickets in the final. In August/September, Kenya hosted an ODI triangular tournament against Australia and Pakistan, losing all four of their matches. This was followed by a place in the 2002 ICC Champions Trophy, though Kenya lost to the West Indies and South Africa, failing to progress beyond the first round.

Namibia toured Kenya in November, playing four one-day games. Kenya won the series 2–1, with one game being abandoned. Kenya then toured Zimbabwe to round off the year, playing three one-day matches against Zimbabwe A, and a three-match ODI series against the full Zimbabwean side. Zimbabwe won the ODI series 2–0, with one match finishing in a no result, and Zimbabwe A won their series against Kenya 2–1.

2003 World Cup and decline
The 2003 Cricket World Cup was to be Kenya's finest moment in international cricket to date. The tournament was held in South Africa, with Kenya hosting their two matches against Sri Lanka and New Zealand. The tournament started with a defeat to South Africa, but Kenya bounced back with a four wicket win over Canada in Cape Town. New Zealand forfeited their match against Kenya in Nairobi due to safety concerns, but Sri Lanka did visit Nairobi and much to their dismay lost by 53 runs as Kenya pulled off another upset victory.

The tournament continued, back in South Africa, with a win over Bangladesh and a defeat to the West Indies. Kenya had done enough to qualify for the Super Six stage, becoming the first non-test nation to progress beyond the first round of the World Cup. In the Super Six stage, they lost to India and Australia, but beat Zimbabwe by seven wickets, qualifying for the semi-final, where they lost to India by 91 runs.

Kenya's World Cup success was rewarded with a spot in a quadrangular tournament at the Sharjah Cricket Association Stadium against Pakistan, Sri Lanka and Zimbabwe, but they lost all three of their games.

Kenya's failure in the above tournament is perhaps indicative of how they failed to capitalise on their World Cup success, though it must be said that not all of that failure was on the field. Although Kenya were given plenty of matches against national A sides, and played in the Carib Beer Cup in the West Indies in 2004, Kenya only played two ODIs in the three years after the Sharjah tournament, against India and Pakistan in the 2004 ICC Champions Trophy.

Off-field setbacks also occurred. Maurice Odumbe was banned for match-fixing in August 2004, and a series of strikes by players led to a weakened Kenyan side being eliminated from the inaugural ICC Intercontinental Cup at the semi-final stage by Scotland. By the end of the dispute in 2005, Kenyan cricket had no sponsors and was in virtual international isolation. At that stage the governing body had dissolved internally and Kenyan cricket opportunities were limited and international cricket for them had virtually ceased.

Rebuilding

2005 to 2007
A rebuilding process began in 2005. The player strikes ceased, and Kenya again reached the semi-finals of the Intercontinental Cup. They warmed up for the semi-finals in Windhoek with a tour of Zimbabwe, to play two first-class and one one-day match against Zimbabwe A. They won all three of those games, and drew against Bermuda in the semi-final of the 2005 ICC Intercontinental Cup but lost to Ireland in the final, despite scoring 404/4 in their first innings.

In early 2006, the Kenya Cricket Association was disbanded and replaced by Cricket Kenya. The rebuilding process was in full swing as Kenya began playing ODI cricket again. Their return to ODI cricket was a five match series against Zimbabwe, which was drawn 2–2 with one match abandoned. This was followed by a four match ODI series against Bangladesh, with Kenya losing all four matches in that series. Their 2006 ICC Intercontinental Cup campaign got off to a poor start with a draw against the Netherlands and a defeat to Canada, but they bounced right back with two ODI wins over Canada at the Toronto Cricket, Skating and Curling Club. Bangladesh toured Kenya in August, winning all three ODIs, before an Intercontinental Cup draw against Bermuda and three ODI wins over Bermuda.

A triangular tournament in Mombasa against Canada and Scotland began Kenya's 2007 and Kenya won the tournament. They then hosted Division One of the World Cricket League at three grounds in Nairobi, playing against Bermuda, Canada, Ireland, the Netherlands and Scotland. Kenya also won this event, beating Scotland in the final. This was followed by the 2007 World Cup, Kenya's fourth World Cup. Kenya beat Canada in the first round, but lost to England and New Zealand, thus missing out on the Super Eight stage.

In October 2007, either side of Intercontinental Cup games, Kenya hosted Canada in two ODIs and then Bermuda in three. Kenya won all five matches, with strong bowling performances setting up relatively comfortable chases batting second.

2008 to 2011
In August 2008, after a break of nine months without a One Day or Twenty20 International, Kenya toured Ireland, Scotland and the Netherlands for various series. It proved a disappointing tour overall, with rain and poor Kenyan batting performances being the main themes.

Kenya initially participated in the 2009 ICC World Twenty20 Qualifier in Belfast, Northern Ireland,
the associate qualification tournament for the 2009 ICC World Twenty20. One of the favourites at the start of the tournament, they finished second in Group B with a loss to the Netherlands and a win over Canada, but losses to Ireland and Scotland in the knock-out stages meant that they finished fourth and thus failed to qualify for the World Twenty20.

Kenya then participated in three ODI series across Europe, but these merely resulted in two wash-outs against Scotland, defeat in a rain-affected one-off match to the Netherlands, and losing a three-match series against Ireland 1–0 with two matches affected by rain.

In October 2008, Kenya hosted Ireland and Zimbabwe in an ODI series in Nairobi, but after a loss to Ireland and a win over Zimbabwe, their last three matches were all abandoned due to rain. After this washed-out series, Kenya then travelled to South Africa for two ODIs, losing heavily in both.

In late January and early February 2009, Kenya played five ODIs at home against Zimbabwe, but lost all of them.

Since the World Cup, a team known as Kenya Select has taken part in Zimbabwe's Logan Cup competition, but did not win a game, also losing to Zimbabwe A.

In their opening match of World Cup 2011 campaign, Kenya faced a mammoth defeat from New Zealand by 10 wickets, they were bowled out for 69 runs and New Zealand won the match in just 8 overs without the loss of a wicket.

In 2011, Kenya was whitewashed by the Netherlands national cricket team in a short 2 match ODI series played in Sportspark Westvielt, Voorburg. During this series, Kenya's weak batting was noted. They made only 208/8 in the first match and an even smaller 184/8 in the second match. Seren Waters and Collins Obuya (the national team captain) did, however, have notable performances – the former making 71 in the first match and the latter scoring 54 in the second match.

Reforms in 2011
For years, the Kenyan players had been the Associate nations' most pampered professionals. The first time Cricket Kenya's notice was attracted was when during the 2011 ODI World Cup, there were reports of internal dissent between the team, as the team had a disastrous World Cup, losing all six of their games. Cricket Kenya announced that it would review the World Cup debacle after the tournament was over. This was the beginning of a series of reforms initiated by the board.

Following the reviews, the board replaced the former Sahara Elite League with the East African tournaments. While the East Africa Premier League is a Twenty20 tournament, the East African Cup is a 50-over tournament. It is currently hoped that this tournaments will produce further new young talents for Kenya in the future. Within months, the East African tournaments were regarded in high esteem and the intensity was up to the brink, as an ESPNcricinfo interview with Cricket Kenya CEO Tom Sears revealed.

Another important reform brought in by the board was to dump the old guard. As described by Cricinfo journalist Martin Williamson, the old guard was not committed to performance and was more keen to selfish gains. The new contracts had completely cut ties with the past, with Collins Obuya, the new captain, being the oldest player at 29. Experienced players like the former captain Jimmy Kamande, a veteran of five World Cups, Thomas Odoyo, and others were not even considered. As was expected, the left-out players were quick to retort as Kamande said that "the board was selecting players who would be their puppets", while Odoyo opined that "it was malicious and not done in good faith". According to them, it was fast-tracking the death of Kenyan cricket. They were also supported by the Kenyan media.

Among the 20 cricketers offered contracts, 13 of them were offered central contracts. To complicate things further, five players turned down those contracts: Alex Obanda, Shem Ngoche, James Ngoche, Nehemiah Odhiambo, and Elijah Otieno. Sears said that they were pleased with the group of seven players who committed to Cricket Kenya, while equally disappointed with those who refused contracts. Accordingly, they were left out of the squad to face the UAE in the ICC Intercontinental Cup.

Cricket Kenya offered contracts to more deserving young, talented players, such as opening batsman Runish Gudhka from Nairobi, the Australian-born all-rounder Duncan Allan, wicketkeeper Irfan Karim, and impressive fast bowlers such as Emmanuel Ringera, Ibrahim Akello, and Dominic Wesonga, who had performed exceedingly well in the regional NPCA and East African leagues.

However, the eight players who had refused the contracts offered by the board, with former skipper Morris Ouma, Alfred Luseno and Nelson Odhiambo being late inclusions, asked their views to be heard, and despite the board granting them another chance, they finally took a firm stance against them. While Obanda, Shem and James Ngoche, Odhiambo, and Otieno were made renewed offers, while Ouma, Luseno, and Nelson had a three-month agreement till March 2012 subject to performance. If they could do something good, they could retain their spot in the team. Sears said of this debacle,"It's a shame that yet again some of these players have turned down their contracts but that is their choice. We met with these players as we promised we would, we listened to their views and made them offers that reflected what they wanted – an agreement that would run until the end of the contract year in May 2012 if they met certain performance criteria which all players have to meet. Perhaps the most disappointing aspect was that they refused to represent their teams in the East African Competitions last weekend pulling out at the very last minute. Again sadly it calls into question the professionalism of these players, how committed they are to putting in the effort, their application in fulfilling their potential and the advice they have been getting from their advisors."

Another reform was to appoint the former Otago coach Mike Hesson as the national coach. Immediately afterwards, Hesson announced that he was here to resolve and put to end the dispute between the players and the board. He said that in an interview to the newspaper Otago Daily Times.

The East Africa finals were rescheduled from October to December 2011 due to heavy showers in Nairobi at that time. However, once again, heavy showers in December led the finals again being postponed to January 2012.

Loss of ODI status: 2014–present
Kenya lost their ODI status after 18 years when they finished outside the top 4 in the 2014 Cricket World Cup Qualifier also failing to qualify for the 2015 Cricket World Cup.

Further failures in the World Cricket League meant that Kenya couldn't regain their ODI status while being subsequently relegated to the new Challenge League.

In April 2018, the ICC decided to grant full Twenty20 International (T20I) status to all its members. Therefore, all Twenty20 cricket matches played between Kenya and other ICC members since 1 January 2019 have been full T20I matches.

International grounds

Tournament history

World Cup

ICC Champions Trophy

ICC World Twenty20

ICC World Twenty20 Qualifier
2008 : 4th place
2010 : 5th place
2012 : 9th place
2013 : 11th place
2015 : 9th place
2019 : 11th place

ICC Intercontinental Cup

2004 : Semi-finals
2005 : Runners
2006–07 : Group stage
2007–08 : 3rd place
2009–10 : 5th place
2011–13 : 7th place
2015–17 : Did not qualify

ICC 6 Nations Challenge
2000 : Won
2002 : Won
2004 : Did not participate

World Cricket League

2007 Division One : Winners
2010 Division One : 6th place
2011–13 WCLC : 6th place
2015 Division Two : 3rd place
2015–17 WCLC : 5th place 
2018 Division Two : 6th place.
2018 Division Three : 4th place
2019-21 Challenge WCL : Qualified

ICC Trophy / World Cup Qualifier
1979 : as part of East Africa
1982 : Group stage
1986 : Group stage
1990 : Semi-finals
1994 : Runners-up
1997 : Runners-up
2001 : Did not participate
2005 : Did not Participate
2009 : 4th place
2014 : 5th place
2018 : Did not qualify
2023 : TBD

Commonwealth Games

1998 : Group stage

ACA Africa T20 Cup
2022: Semi-final

Current squad 
This lists all the players who have played for Kenya in the past 12 months or has been part of the latest One-day or T20I squad. Updated as of 22 September 2022.

Coaching history
1990–1996:  Hanumant Singh
1996–2003:  Sandeep Patil
2003–2004:  Andy Moles
2004–2005:  Mudassar Nazar
2005–2006:  Alfred Njuguna (interim)
2006–2007:  Roger Harper
2007–2008:  Alfred Njuguna (interim)
2008–2009:  Andy Kirsten
2009–2011:  Eldine Baptiste
2011–2012:  Mike Hesson
2012–2013:  Robin Brown
2013–2014:  Steve Tikolo
2015–2018:  Thomas Odoyo
2018–2021:  Maurice Odumbe
2021–present:  David Obuya

Records

International Match Summary – Kenya

Last updated 25 November 2022

One Day Internationals
 Highest team total: 347/3 v Bangladesh, 10 October 1997 at Gymkhana Club Ground, Nairobi
 Highest individual score: 144, Kennedy Otieno v Bangladesh, 10 October 1997 at Gymkhana Club Ground, Nairobi
 Best individual bowling figures: 5/24, Collins Obuya v Sri Lanka, 24 February 2003 at Gymkhana Club Ground, Nairobi

Most ODI runs for Kenya

Most ODI wickets for Kenya

Highest individual innings in ODI

Best bowling figures in an innings in ODI

ODI record versus other nations

Records complete to ODI #3529. Last updated 3 October 2014.

Twenty20 Internationals
 Highest team total: 237/5 v Lesotho, 21 November 2022 at IPRC Cricket Ground, Kigali
 Highest individual score: 103*, Alex Obanda v Nigeria, 18 November 2021 at IPRC Cricket Ground, Kigali
 Best individual bowling figures: 6/17, Peter Langat v Mali, 20 November 2022 at Gahanga International Cricket Stadium, Kigali

Most T20I runs for Kenya

Most T20I wickets for Kenya

T20I record versus other nations

Records complete to T20I #1922. Last updated 25 November 2022.

Notes
 Excluding appearances in the 1975 Cricket World Cup and the 1979 ICC Trophy as part of East Africa.

See also

Kenyan women's cricket team
Cricket Kenya
National Elite League Twenty20
List of Kenyan ODI cricketers
List of Kenyan Twenty20 International cricketers
List of Kenyan first-class cricketers
Kenyan national cricket captains

References

External links
Official Site
 
 
 
Kenya Cricket blog
Kenya Cricket Results
Kenya Cricket Results
Kenyanstar

National cricket teams
Kenya in international cricket
Cricket